Kingoceras is a genus of ammonoids in the order Ceratitida and family Paraceltitidae which lived during the Late Permian from about 265 to about 254 million years ago. The shell is thinly lenticular, sutures are goniatitic and have only eight fully distinct lobes.

Two species are recognized. The type, Kingoceras kingi Miller 1944 comes from the Permian of state of Coahuila, Mexico, from concretionary shale and limestone of the La Difunta Formation and from offshore sandstone and mudstone of the La Colorada Formation. A second species, Kingoceras achurense, named by Zakharov 1983, is included, which comes from the Upper Permian Akhura Formation of Azerbaijan.

References

 GONIAT -online Kingoceras entry.
 The Paleobiology Database Kingoceras entry

Paraceltitidae
Ceratitida genera
Permian ammonites
Fossils of Mexico